The Arnott Baronetcy, of Woodlands in the Parish of St Anne, Shandon in the County of Cork, is a title in the Baronetage of the United Kingdom. It was created on 12 February 1896 for the Irish entrepreneur and philanthropist John Arnott.

Arnott baronets, of Woodlands, St Anne (1896)
Sir John Arnott, 1st Baronet (1814–1898)
Sir John Alexander Arnott, 2nd Baronet (1853–1940)
Sir Lauriston John Arnott, 3rd Baronet (1890–1958)
Sir Robert John Arnott, 4th Baronet (1896–1966)
Sir John Robert Alexander Arnott, 5th Baronet (1927–1981)
Sir Alexander John Maxwell Arnott, 6th Baronet (born 1975)

Arms

See also
 Arnot baronets

References

Kidd, Charles, Williamson, David (editors). Debrett's Peerage and Baronetage (1990 edition). New York: St Martin's Press, 1990.

Arnott